Alfred Leopold Isidor Kubin (10 April 1877 – 20 August 1959) was an Austrian printmaker, illustrator, and occasional writer. Kubin is considered an important representative of Symbolism and Expressionism.

Biography 
Kubin was born in Bohemia in the town of Leitmeritz, Austro-Hungarian Empire (now Litoměřice). From 1892 to 1896, he was apprenticed to the landscape photographer Alois Beer, although he learned little. In 1896, he attempted suicide on his mother's grave, and his short stint in the Austrian army the following year ended with a nervous breakdown. In 1898, Kubin began a period of artistic study at a private academy run by the painter Ludwig Schmitt-Reutte, before enrolling at the Munich Academy in 1899, without finishing his studies there. In Munich, Kubin discovered the works of Odilon Redon, Edvard Munch, James Ensor, Henry de Groux, and Félicien Rops. He was profoundly affected by the prints of Max Klinger, and later recounted: "Here a new art was thrown open to me, which offered free play for the imaginative expression of every conceivable world of feeling. Before putting the engravings away I swore that I would dedicate my life to the creation of similar works". The aquatint technique used by Klinger and Goya influenced the style of his works of this period, which are mainly ink and wash drawings of fantastical, often macabre subjects. Kubin produced a small number of oil paintings in the years between 1902 and 1910, but thereafter his output consisted of pen and ink drawings, watercolors, and lithographs. In 1911, he became associated with the Blaue Reiter group, and exhibited with them in the Galerie Der Sturm in Berlin in 1913. After that time, he lost contact with the artistic avant-garde.

Kubin is considered an important representative of Symbolism and Expressionism and is noted for dark, spectral, symbolic fantasies, often assembled into thematic series of drawings. Like Oskar Kokoschka and Albert Paris Gütersloh, Kubin had both artistic and literary talent. He illustrated works of Edgar Allan Poe, E. T. A. Hoffmann, and Fyodor Dostoevsky, among others. Kubin also illustrated the German fantasy magazine Der Orchideengarten.

From 1906 until his death, he lived a withdrawn life in a Manor-House on a 12th-century estate in Zwickledt, Upper Austria. In 1938, at the Anschluss of Austria and Nazi Germany, his work was declared entartete Kunst or "degenerate art," but he managed to continue working during World War II.

The Other Side 
Kubin's only literary work was Die andere Seite (1908), a fantastic novel set in an oppressive imaginary land. The novel has an atmosphere of claustrophobic absurdity similar to the writings of Franz Kafka, who admired the book. The illustrations for the book were originally intended for The Golem by Gustav Meyrink, but as that book was delayed, Kubin instead worked his illustrations into his own novel.

Nazi-looted art 
In 2016, the Städtische Galerie im Lenbachhaus Munich restituted, to the heirs of Max and Hertha Morgenstern, 16 drawings by Kubin which had been sold under duress in Vienna in July 1938 as a result of Nazi persecution of Jews following Austria's Anschluss with Nazi Germany.  Lenbachhaus had acquired them from Kurt Otte, a Kubin collector in Hamburg in 1971.

The German Lost Art Foundation lists 24 artworks by Kubin in its database, many of which are from the Found-Object Reports from the Staatliche Kunstsammlungen Dresden Kupferstichkabinett in Dresden  which launched Nazi-era provenance research in 2008.

Honours and awards
 City of Vienna Prize for Visual Arts (1950)
 Grand Austrian State Prize for Visual Art (1951)
 Austrian Medal for Science and Art (1957)
 Gustav Klimt badge as an honorary member of the Vienna Secession

Collections 

 Kubin's Dance of Death and Other Drawings (1973) (art collection)
 The Life and Art of Alfred Kubin (2017) (autobiography)

Gallery

See also 

 List of Austrian artists and architects
 List of Austrians

Notes

References 
 Arnason, H. H., & Wheeler, D. (1986). History of Modern Art: Painting, Sculpture, Architecture, Photography. Englewood Cliffs, N.J.: Prentice-Hall. 
 Assman, Peter Alfred Kubin 1877–1959. Exhibition catalogue Brussels (Ixelles) 1997
 Alfred Kubin. Exhibition catalogue Neue Galerie New York 2008
 Romana Schuler Alfred Kubin, Aus meinem Reich. Exhibition catalogue Leopold Museum Vienna 2003
 Traumgestalten. 100 Meisterwerke aus dem Besitz der Graphischen Sammlung Albertina. Vienna 1990

External links 
 
 
 www.alfred-kubin.com (in German)
 Stefan Üner: Alfred Kubin. Bewusst in Unbewusste, in: Parnass, Vienna 2019
 Water Spirit: oil painting by Alfred Kubin
 Die Blaetter mit dem Tod: book of prints by Alfred Kubin at the Leo Baeck Institute, New York
 More than 200 paintings and drawings by Alfred Kubin
 

1877 births
1959 deaths
19th-century Austrian people
20th-century Austrian novelists
20th-century Austrian male writers
Academy of Fine Arts, Munich alumni
Austrian autobiographers
Austrian etchers
Austrian illustrators
Austrian fantasy writers
Austrian people of German Bohemian descent
Austrian people of Czech descent
Austrian speculative fiction artists
Austrian male novelists
People from Litoměřice
Recipients of the Austrian Decoration for Science and Art
Recipients of the Grand Austrian State Prize
Writers who illustrated their own writing
Weird fiction writers